The 1932 Württemberg state election was held on 24 April 1932 to elect the 80 members of the Landtag of the Free People's State of Württemberg.

Results

References 

1932 elections in Germany
1932